Sam Shepherd may refer to:

Samuel Shepherd, British barrister
Sam Shepherd (Groveland Four), American man killed by Sheriff Willis V. McCall
Sam Shepherd (basketball), Venezuelan basketball player
Floating Points, the recording and performing moniker of electronic musician Sam Shepherd

See also
Sam Shepard (disambiguation)
Sam Sheppard, American physician involved in a famous murder trial
Samuel Shepheard (disambiguation)